Anaa Airport  is an airport serving Anaa, an atoll in the Tuamotu archipelago in French Polynesia. The airport type is medium and the World Area Code is 823. The nearest airport (76.22 km) is Faaite Airport. The airport is recorded to be 3m above sea level and contains a runway of length 1500m.

Airlines and destinations

Passenger
There are no scheduled passenger flights as of September 2022.

Statistics

See also
List of airports in French Polynesia

References

External links 

Airports in French Polynesia